Nongallabasu Thaballei Manam (English: Lingering Fragrance) is a 2005 Indian Meitei language film written and directed by Moirangthem Inao and produced by Monasi, under the banner of Tondon Films. It stars Nityaibi, Laimayum Gaitri, Thingom Pritam and Manda Leima in the lead roles. It is based on the famous radio play of the same title.

In the radio play, the roles of R.K. Manisana and Phajabi are played by the renowned actors Ningthoukhongjam Medhajeet and Thongam Thoithoi respectively. The dialogues from the play are still fondly remembered by the radio play lovers of Manipur. In the movie, Nityaibi's voice is dubbed by Ningthoukhongjam Medhajeet.

Synopsis
Heinou and Urirei are lovebirds. They happen to elope one day. Manisana, Heinou's father, is apprehensive about the family's consent of Urirei as his son is not qualified enough whereas Urirei is a doctor. Apart from it, Manisana has other reasons. When enquired by Surbala, his wife, he narrates his past life of a bachelor.

Manisana and Phajabi (Urirei's mother) grew up in the same locality. Phajabi loved Manisana, whom she lovingly addressed as Yambung. She was caring, sweet and child-like. On the contrary, Manisana loved Tamphasana, a lady from the neighbouring village. He always took Phajabi's love for granted and teased her all the time. As time passed by, Phajabi's hope to win Manisana's  heart withered away. He went to Imphal for further studies and Phajabi got engaged to a guy from Imphal.

Unlike Manisana and Phajabi's mismatch, Urirei and Heinou have a happy union.

Cast
 Nityaibi as R.K. Manisana
 Laimayum Gaitri as Phajabi
 Thingom Pritam as R.K. Heinou
 Manda Leima as Dr. Urirei
 Sagolsem Dhanamanjuri as Surbala, Manisana's wife
 Homeshwori as Tamphasana's friend
 Ronita
 Ibomcha
 Narmada
 Haridas
 James
 Indira
 Romi

Soundtrack
Sagolsem Tijendra composed the soundtrack for the film and Makhonmani Mongsaba and Moirangthem Inao wrote the lyrics. The movie has four songs sung by Sonali Mukherjee, Sagolsem Tijendra, Maibam Roshibina and Dinesh Sharma.

References

2005 films
Meitei-language films